Reginald Lindesay-Bethune, 12th Earl of Lindsay, JP, DL (18 May 1867 – 14 January 1939), known as Viscount Garnock 1894-1917, was a Scottish nobleman and British Army officer.

The eldest son of the 11th Earl of Lindsay and Emily Marian Crosse, he succeeded his father in 1917, and assumed the additional surname of Lindesay in 1919.

Lord Garnock was commissioned a second lieutenant in the 8th Hussars on 16 November 1887, promoted to lieutenant on 5 June 1889, and to captain on 30 July 1894. He served with the regiment in South Africa in 1901–1902 during the Second Boer War, and was promoted major on 19 October 1901. The war ended in June 1902, and Lord Garnock stayed in South Africa until December that year, when he left on the SS Kinfauns Castle. He later served with the East Riding of Yorkshire Yeomanry.

Lord Garnock was unsuccessful Conservative parliamentary candidate for Buckrose, East Yorkshire, in 1906. He was a Scottish representative peer in the House of Lords from 1917. He was also Master of Fife Fox Hounds.

Garnock married Beatrice Mary, daughter of John Shaw of Welburn Hall, Yorkshire. His brother Archibald Bethune, 13th Earl of Lindsay, succeeded him to the Earldom upon his death in 1939.

References

Further reading

1867 births
1939 deaths
8th King's Royal Irish Hussars officers
East Riding of Yorkshire Yeomanry officers
Reginald
Deputy Lieutenants of Fife
Earls of Lindsay
Masters of foxhounds in Scotland